The 633rd Tank Destroyer Battalion was a self-propelled tank destroyer battalion of the United States Army active during the Second World War.

The battalion was activated on 15 December 1941 as part of the general reorganisation of the anti-tank force. It deployed into France in April 1945, equipped with M18 Hellcat tank destroyers, attached to 16th Armored Division. The battalion moved into Germany, seeing action around Nuremberg in the first week of May, and finishing the war at Plzeň, inside Czechoslovakia.

References

 Tankdestroyer.net (Web based United States tank destroyer forces information resource) Tankdestroyer.net

Tank destroyer battalions of the United States Army
Military units and formations disestablished in 1945
Military units and formations established in 1941